Suresh Bhardwaj (born 15 March 1952) is an Indian politician and member of the Bharatiya Janata Party. Bhardwaj was a member of the Himachal Pradesh Legislative Assembly from the Shimla constituency in Shimla district. He was Cabinet Minister for Law and Education in Jairam Thakur led BJP government.
He lost from the Kasumpti seat in 2022 vidhansabha elections, defeated by sitting Congress MLA Anirudh Singh.

References 

People from Shimla
Bharatiya Janata Party politicians from Himachal Pradesh
Living people
1952 births
Rajya Sabha members from Himachal Pradesh
Himachal Pradesh MLAs 2017–2022
State cabinet ministers of Himachal Pradesh
Rajya Sabha members from the Bharatiya Janata Party